The following is a list of 2021 box office number-one films in South Korea. When the number-one film in gross is not the same as the number-one film in admissions, both are listed.

Highest-grossing films

See also
 List of South Korean films of 2021
 Impact of the COVID-19 pandemic on cinema
 List of 2020 box office number-one films in South Korea
 List of 2022 box office number-one films in South Korea

References

2021
South Korea
2021 in South Korean cinema